FK Karaorman is a football club from Struga, North Macedonia. They are currently competing in the Macedonian Second League.

History
The club was founded in 1923 under the name Crn Drin, by the advanced Struga youth. Among its creators was famous Macedonian painter, Vangel Kodžoman. After World War II, the club got its current name Karaorman. In their history they have played one season in the Macedonian First League back in 1993–94. Mostly they have competed in the Macedonian Second League, except for a short period when they were a member of the Macedonian Third League Southwest (Lake Region).

Former Macedonia national team player Artim Šakiri started his youth career at the club.

Current squad 
As of 23 February 2023.

Honours
 Macedonian Second League:
Runners-up (3): 1992–93, 1996–97, 1999–2000

Recent seasons

1The 2019–20 and 2020–21 seasons were abandoned due to the COVID-19 pandemic in North Macedonia.

References

External links

Club info at MacedonianFootball 
Football Federation of Macedonia 
MAK Football  

Karaorman
Association football clubs established in 1923
1923 establishments in Yugoslavia
Sport in Struga